Filiz Hyusmenova (born 10 June 1966 in Silistra, Bulgaria) is a Bulgarian politician of Bulgarian-Turkish descent who served as a Member of the European Parliament (MEP) from 2007 until 2019. She is a member of the Movement for Rights and Freedoms, part of the Alliance of Liberals and Democrats for Europe.

Political career

Career in national politics 
From 2003 until 2005, Hyusmenova served as Minister without portfolio in the government of Prime Minister Simeon Saxe-Coburg-Gotha.

Member of the European Parliament, 2007–2019 
Hyusmenova became an Member of the European Parliament on 1 January 2007 with the accession of Bulgaria to the European Union. In parliament, she served on the Committee on Regional Development (2007–2014), the Committee on Civil Liberties, Justice and Home Affairs (2014–2019) and the Committee on Women's Rights and Gender Equality (2017–2019).

In addition to her committee assignments, Hyusmenova was part of the parliament's delegations for relations to the Euronest Parliamentary Assembly (2009–2014); to the EU-Armenia, EU-Azerbaijan and EU-Georgia Parliamentary Cooperation Committees (2009–2014); and with Japan (2014–2019).

From 2014 until 2019, Hyusmenova served as a vice-chair of the Alliance of Liberals and Democrats for Europe group under the leadership of chairman Hans van Baalen.

References

External links
European Parliament profile
European Parliament official photo

1966 births
Living people
Bulgarian people of Turkish descent
People from Silistra
Movement for Rights and Freedoms MEPs
Women MEPs for Bulgaria
MEPs for Bulgaria 2007
MEPs for Bulgaria 2007–2009
MEPs for Bulgaria 2009–2014
MEPs for Bulgaria 2014–2019
21st-century Bulgarian women politicians
21st-century Bulgarian politicians